Ravi Prakash is an Indian actor who primarily appears in Telugu and Tamil films.

Career
Ravi was born in Vijayawada and grew up in Visakhapatnam, India. After completing his secondary education, he chose to pursue a career in medicine and studied for his MBBS degree in Russia. During his university holidays, Ravi returned to Visakhapatnam and often took part in modelling, while also attending the Satyanand Acting Institute alongside his friends. He was spotted by the film studio, Ushakiran Movies, who offered him the chance to play the leading role in their production, Subhavela (2000). Credited in the film as Ravikanth, his first film opened to mixed reviews and went unnoticed at the box office, with a critic noting the "newcomers fail to impress". The failure of the film prompted him to finish his degree and then train as a house surgeon, before he decided to concentrate on a career in the film industry. After his break, he was first offered the chance to portray a small role in Eeswar (2002), before developing a niche in portraying bigger supporting roles in films. Notably, he portrayed a police officer in Gautham Vasudev Menon's Gharshana (2004) and Trivikram Srinivas's Athadu (2005).

In the early 2010s, he featured in more Tamil films and notably appeared as a pilot in the heist drama Payanam (2011), as a police officer in the anthology film Vaanam (2011), a villain in K. V. Anand's action drama Maattrraan (2012) and as the lead actor's supportive brother in Gautham Menon Neethane En Ponvasantham (2012).

Notable filmography

Films

Television

References

External links
 

Indian male film actors
Male actors in Tamil cinema
Living people
Male actors in Telugu cinema
Male actors from Visakhapatnam
21st-century Indian male actors
Male actors from Vijayawada
1978 births
Telugu male actors